Jakob Otto Schweizer (March 27, 1863, Zurich - 1955) was a Swiss-American sculptor noted for his work on war memorials.

Biography
Born in Zurich, Switzerland, Schweizer enrolled in that city's Industrial Art School in 1879. In 1882, he entered the Dresden Academy of Fine Arts in Dresden, Germany, where he studied with Johannes Schilling.  He then lived in Florence, Italy, 1889-94. He arrived in New York City in 1894, and settled in Philadelphia the following year.

He was a member of Philadelphia's German Society of Pennsylvania, and through its connections he obtained his first major commission, a bronze statue of General John Peter Gabriel Muhlenberg (1910–11). He was also a Freemason.

Schweizer created 7 sculptures for the Gettysburg Battlefield, more than any other artist. Among these was a larger-than-life statue of Abraham Lincoln for the Pennsylvania State Memorial. He modeled another Lincoln statue for the Memorial Room at the Union League of Philadelphia, and flanked it with 8 portrait reliefs of Union officers. His only equestrian statue, Baron von Steuben (1921), is in Milwaukee. He modeled dozens of busts, bas-reliefs and medallions, and exhibited at the 1916 continuation of the Panama–Pacific International Exposition in San Francisco.

His All Wars Memorial to Colored Soldiers and Sailors (1934), originally placed in Philadelphia's Fairmount Park, was relocated to Logan Square in 1994.

Schweizer died in 1955, at the age of 92.

Selected works

Civil War Monument (1909), Colorado State Capitol, Denver, with Captain John D. Howland.
Statue of General John Peter Gabriel Muhlenberg (1910–11), Philadelphia Museum of Art Sculpture Garden, Philadelphia.
Statue of Baron von Steuben (1912–14), Utica, New York. A 1915 replica of this with bas-relief is at Valley Forge National Historical Park.
Bust of Joseph Johns (1913), Central Park, Johnstown, Pennsylvania.
Monument to Confederate Women (1913), Arkansas State Capitol, Little Rock, Arkansas.
James Bartram Nicholson (1913), Mount Peace Cemetery, Philadelphia.
Relief bust of General John P. Taylor (1914), Church Hill Cemetery, Reedsville, Pennsylvania.
Molly Pitcher Monument (1916), Old Graveyard, Carlisle, Pennsylvania.
Reverend Henry Melchior Muhlenberg Monument (1917), Lutheran Theological Seminary,  Philadelphia.
Statue of President James A. Garfield (1918), Long Branch, New Jersey.
Statue of Senator George T. Oliver (19__), Rotunda, Pennsylvania State Capitol, Harrisburg, Pennsylvania.
Statue of General Thomas J. Stewart (19__), Rotunda, Pennsylvania State Capitol, Harrisburg, Pennsylvania.
Fort Stevens Monument and Marker (1920), Fort Stevens, Washington, DC.
Equestrian statue of Baron von Steuben (1921), Washington Park, Milwaukee.
American Eagle (World War I Memorial) (1923), Chelten Square, E. Chelten Ave. & Wister St., Philadelphia.
Schoonmaker Monument (1920s?), Homewood Cemetery, Pittsburgh, Pennsylvania.
Lily Pond Railing (surrounding George Frampton's Peter Pan statue) (1930), Johnson Park, Camden, New Jersey.
All Wars Memorial to Colored Soldiers and Sailors (1934), Logan Square, Philadelphia. Relocated from West Fairmount Park in 1994.
The Last Supper (1940s?), Mount Hope Cemetery, Topeka, Kansas.
The Last Supper (1944), Scranton Cultural Center at the Masonic Temple, Scranton, Pennsylvania.

Gettysburg Battlefield
President Abraham Lincoln (1913), Pennsylvania State Memorial.
General David McMurtrie Gregg (1913), Pennsylvania State Memorial.
General Alfred Pleasonton (1913), Pennsylvania State Memorial.
General William Wells (1914), South Confederate Avenue. Another casting (1914) of this is at Battery Park, Burlington, Vermont.
General John Geary (c. 1914), Culp's Hill.
General Alexander Hays (c. 1914), Ziegler's Grove.
General Andrew A. Humphreys (1919), Emmitsburg Road.

Union League of Philadelphia
President Abraham Lincoln (1915–17).
Relief bust of General George Gordon Meade (1914–17).
Relief bust of General William T. Sherman (1914–17).
Relief bust of General George H. Thomas (1914–17).
Relief bust of Admiral David G. Farragut (1914–17).
Relief bust of General Ulysses S. Grant (1914–17).
Relief bust of General Phillip H. Sheridan (1914–17).
Relief bust of General Winfield S. Hancock (1914–17).
Relief bust of General David McMurtrie Gregg (1914–17).

Gallery

References
Ernst Jockers, J. Otto Schweizer: The Man and His Work, (Philadelphia: International Printing Company, 1953).

External links
J. Otto Schweizer at ArtNet
J. Otto Schweizer at AskArt

1863 births
1955 deaths
Artists from Zürich
Swiss emigrants to the United States
American people of Swiss-German descent
Artists from Philadelphia
Swiss sculptors
20th-century American sculptors
19th-century American sculptors
19th-century American male artists
American male sculptors
National Sculpture Society members
Sculptors from Pennsylvania
20th-century American male artists